Lee Imiolek (born 21 September 1990, in Manchester) is an English rugby union footballer. He plays as a prop. He plays his club rugby for the RFU Championship side Leeds Carnegie. He made his first appearance for Sale Sharks against London Irish on 28 March 2010.

References

1990 births
Living people
English rugby union players
Leeds Tykes players
People educated at Sandbach School
Rugby union players from Manchester
Sale Sharks players
Rugby union props